FOID or foid may refer to:

 FOID (firearms), a firearm owner's identification card in Illinois
 Form of identification, used in the travel industry as a term for an identity document
 Feldspathoid, sometimes called a "foid", a class of mineral found in igneous rocks ("foid" can also refer to the rocks themselves)